Cecil Newman (July 25, 1903 – February 8, 1976) was an American civic leader and prominent businessman in Minneapolis, Minnesota.  He was a member of the Brotherhood of Sleeping Car Porters, a union that made major strides against segregation in the 1930s and 1940s, before the modern Civil Rights Movement.

Early life 
Cecil Newman was born in Kansas City, Missouri, on July 25, 1903.

Career 
Newman moved to Minneapolis from Kansas City in 1922. 

He founded the Twin Cities Herald about 1927 and published the Timely Digest in 1932. In 1934, Newman became editor and publisher of the Minneapolis Spokesman and the St. Paul Recorder. In 1948, Newman became the first black president of the Minneapolis Urban League.

Legacy 
After Nicollet Avenue South in Minneapolis was blocked by the Kmart at Lake Street, a one block long, one-way street was added in order to allow north bound traffic from 1st Avenue South to get over to Nicollet; it was named Cecil Newman Lane.

The Minnesota Spokesman-Recorder (the Minneapolis Spokesman and the St. Paul Recorder merged in 2000), is the oldest continuously operated black newspaper and possibly longest-lived black-owned business in Minnesota. In 1958 it moved to 3744 Fourth Avenue South. In 2015, the Spokesman-Recorder' celebrated its eightieth anniversary and its building was designated a historic landmark.

Personal life 
Cecil Newman was married to Launa Q. Newman. The length of 4th Avenue South between 36th Street and 42nd Street was named in her honor as "Launa Q. Newman Way".

References

1903 births
1976 deaths
Businesspeople from Minneapolis
Businesspeople from Kansas City, Missouri
20th-century American non-fiction writers
20th-century American businesspeople